Canterbury Olympic Ice Rink is an ice sports and public ice skating centre, located in the Sydney suburb of Canterbury, New South Wales. It hosts a number of major ice hockey games, including East Coast Super League games. The venue offers a wide variety of activities including ice skating lessons, birthday parties, figure skating, speed skating, synchronised skating, public skating sessions. It is also the home venue of the Sydney Figure Skating Club, Sydney Arrows (speed skating), Canterbury Ice Hockey Club and is also a host venue of the East Coast Super League, Sydney's elite ice hockey tournament.

See also

List of ice rinks in Australia
Australian Women's Ice Hockey League

References

Figure skating venues in Australia
Ice hockey venues in Australia
Speed skating venues in Australia
Indoor arenas in Australia
Canterbury, New South Wales